Scott Jackson Crichton (born June 1, 1954) is a justice of the Louisiana Supreme Court. He was a judge of the Louisiana 1st Judicial District Court in Shreveport from 1991 to 2014. Crichton was elected to the district court in 1990 as a Democrat. In 2014, he ran without opposition to succeed the retiring Justice Jeffrey P. Victory for the District 2 seat on the seven-member state Supreme Court. The nonpartisan blanket primary for the position was held on November 4, 2014 in eleven northwest Louisiana parishes.

Background
Crichton is the son of Thomas Crichton, III (1917–1989), who though born in Monroe was a businessman-landholder descended from a pioneer family in Minden in Webster Parish east of Shreveport. His mother, the former Mary Murff (1919–1983), was a native of Shreveport; her grandfather was a district court judge in 1906. Crichton himself was born in Shreveport but attended school for the first eight years in Minden. For high school, he was sent to the private boarding school, the Webb School in Bell Buckle in Bedford County near Shelbyville in middle Tennessee. The school then had an enrollment of only two hundred but with a demanding curriculum, honor code, and required obstacle courses including the development of survival skills.

After graduation from the Webb School, Crichton attended Louisiana State University in Baton Rouge, from which he received his undergraduate degree in 1976. In 1980, he received his Juris Doctor degree from the Louisiana State University Law Center. He and his wife, the former Susan "Susie" Simonton (born November 23, 1957), whom he married c. 1986, have two sons, Stuart Jackson Crichton (a 2013 LSU Law school graduate) and Sam Crichton (a 2014 LSU Law school graduate). Since 1985, the judge has been a member of St. Mark's Episcopal Cathedral in Shreveport.

Legal career
More than five hundred people attended Crichton's campaign kickoff party on April 29, 2013, at Ernest's Orleans Restaurant in Shreveport. Among those in attendance were fellow judges and law enforcement officials from around the state. Had he drawn an opponent, Crichton's campaign was to have been co-managed by his wife Susie and Carolyn Prator, the wife of Crichton's friend, Caddo Parish Sheriff Steve Prator.

In 2017, Crichton ruled that a prisoner being interrogated by police who said "just me a lawyer dog" did not actually request a lawyer, because the request was ambiguous as to whether the prison was requesting a lawyer or a dog.

References

1954 births
Living people
American Episcopalians
Louisiana Democrats
Louisiana lawyers
Louisiana state court judges
Louisiana State University alumni
Louisiana State University Law Center alumni
Justices of the Louisiana Supreme Court
Politicians from Minden, Louisiana
Politicians from Shreveport, Louisiana
Webb School (Bell Buckle, Tennessee) alumni
20th-century American judges
21st-century American judges